Hervantajärvi is the southernmost district of the Tampere city in Pirkanmaa, Finland, located about eight kilometers southeast of the city center. It is bordered on the west by Vuores and on the north by Ruskontie, on the north by Hervanta and Rusko. In the east the border is between Kangasala and in the south against Lempäälä. The district is named after Lake Hervanta in the area, which is partly on the Lempäälä side.

The Hervantajärvi area is mainly home to holiday homes and a beach, but multi-storey and detached houses are under construction for about 3,000 inhabitants. A terminal stop on the city tramway is also planned for Hervantajärvi.

References

External links 
Hervantajärven tonttien asiakirjat at Tampere.fi (in Finnish)

Districts of Tampere